The Carolina Association was a minor league baseball league that played from 1908 to 1912. The Carolina Association played as a six–team Class D level league. The league consisted of teams based in North Carolina and South Carolina, with the same six franchises playing for the duration of the league.

History
The Carolina Association began play as a six–team Class D level league in the 1908 season. The league president was George L. Hammond. The charter members were the Anderson Electricians of Anderson, South Carolina, Charlotte Hornets of Charlotte, North Carolina, Greensboro Champs of Greenville, South Carolina, Greenville Spinners of Greenville, South Carolina, Spartanburg Spartans of Spartanburg, South Carolina and Winston-Salem Twins of Winston-Salem, North Carolina. The same six franchises played for the duration of the league history. The Anderson Electrics name derived from a recently built hydro electric plant in Anderson.

In their first season of play, the 1908 Carolina Association played a regular season without playoffs, which continued throughout their existence. The 1908 final standings featured the Greensboro Champs (51–38), Spartanburg Spartans (49–39), Greenville Spinners (48–36), Winston-Salem Twins (41–48), Charlotte Hornets (40–47) and Anderson Electricians (32–53).

On May 9, 1908, Spartanburg turned a triple play against the Greensboro Champs. A native of the Greenville, South Carolina area, Shoeless Joe Jackson played for the 1908 Greenville Spinners, hitting .346 to lead the Carolina Association. While earning a salary of $75.00 a month, Jackson also led the Carolina Association in hits (120) and RBI (72). In August, 1908, Jackson's contract was purchased by the Philadelphia Athletics for $900.00 and Jackson immediately made his major league debut. Today, there is a museum and monuments honoring Jackson in Greenville.

In 1909, Joseph H. Wearn became the Carolina Association president, a position he would hold for the remaining duration of the league. The 1909 Carolina Association final standings were won by for the second consecutive season by Greensboro. The Greensboro Patriots (65–44) were followed by the Anderson Electricians (63–48), Winston-Salem Twins (54–52), Greenville Spinners (61–51), Winston-Salem Twins (54–52) and Spartanburg Spartans (40–71). 

The Greenville Spinners (63–40) were the 1910 Carolina Association Champions. Following Greenville in the standings were the Charlotte Hornets (56–50), Anderson Electricians (56–54), Winston-Salem Twins (51–57), Spartanburg Spartans (50–57) and Greensboro Champs (46–64).

In the 1911 Carolina Association, the Winston-Salem Twins (72–37) won the championship. The Greensboro Patriots (66–43), Charlotte Hornets (52–58), Anderson Electricians (48–59), Spartanburg Spartans (44–63) and Greenville Spinners (42–64) rounded out the 1911 final standings.

In their final season of play, the 1912 Carolina Association champions were the Anderson Electricians (66–44). Anderson was followed by the Winston-Salem Twins (63–47), Charlotte Hornets (61–46), Spartanburg Red Sox (54–55), Greensboro Patriots (51–59) and Greenville Spinners (34–78).

After the 1912 season, the Carolina Association evolved into the 1913 Class D level North Carolina State League. Joseph H. Wearn continued as president of the newly named league. The three North Carolina franchises continued play in the North Carolina State League without the three South Carolina franchises.

Carolina Association teams

Standings & statistics
The Carolina Association had no playoffs. The regular season 1st place team was the league champion.

1908 Carolina Association
No Playoffs.

1909 Carolina Association
No Playoffs.

1910 Carolina Association 
schedule
No Playoffs:

1911 Carolina Association 
No Playoffs.

1912 Carolina Association
schedule
No Playoffs:

References

Defunct minor baseball leagues in the United States
Baseball leagues in North Carolina
Defunct professional sports leagues in the United States
Sports leagues established in 1908
Sports leagues disestablished in 1912
Baseball leagues in South Carolina
1908 establishments in the United States
1912 disestablishments in the United States